Catoptria pauperellus is a species of moth in the family Crambidae. It is found in Poland, Slovakia, Ukraine, Romania, Serbia and Montenegro, Bosnia and Herzegovina and Albania.

References

Moths described in 1832
Crambini
Moths of Europe